This is the list of Masterpiece Contemporary episodes in order by season.

Episodes

In early 2008, Masterpiece Theatre and its affiliated program Mystery! were reformatted as Masterpiece.  Masterpiece is aired as three different series.  Initially, Masterpiece Classic aired in the winter and early spring, Masterpiece Mystery! in the late spring and summer, and Masterpiece Contemporary in the fall.  In later seasons, particularly after an increase in funding for WGBH and Masterpiece, the scheduling became more random.  Currently, all three programs air at any time throughout the year, and on nearly half the Sundays, two episodes from two different miniseries will air on the same night.

This lists the titles of the individual miniseries.  Some ran for only one episode, many ran for two or more installments.  The following lists them according to original season, and then in alphabetical order.  The number of the season continues in the sequence set by the predecessor series, Masterpiece Theatre, which ended with Season 37.  This is in spite of the fact that the other predecessor series, Mystery!, ended with Season 27.  All episodes that air in one calendar year are considered to be in the same season.

For lists of episodes of the other two series, see List of Masterpiece Classic episodes, and List of Masterpiece Mystery! episodes.  For older episodes of Masterpiece Theatre, see List of Masterpiece Theatre episodes.

This list does not include any rebroadcasts of series, including those previously shown on Masterpiece Theatre or Mystery!

Season 38 (2008)
Filth: The Mary Whitehouse Story (Nov 16)
God on Trial (Nov 9)
The Last Enemy (Oct 5, 12, 19, 26 and Nov 2)
The Unseen Alistair Cooke - A Masterpiece Special (Nov 23)

Season 39 (2009)
Collision (Nov 15 and 22)
Endgame (Oct 25)
Place of Execution (Nov 1 and 8)

Season 40 (2010)
Framed (Dec 26)
Lennon Naked (Nov 21)

Season 41 (2011)
Page Eight (Worricker Trilogy, Part One) (Nov 6)
The Song of Lunch (Nov 13)

Season 42 (2012)
No New Episodes

Season 43 (2013)
No New Episodes

Season 44 (2014)
Turks & Caicos (Worricker Trilogy, Part Two) (Nov 9)
Salting the Battlefield (Worricker Trilogy, Part Three) (Nov 16)

Season 45 (2015)
No New Episodes

Season 46 (2016)
No New Episodes

Season 47 (2017)
No New Episodes

Season 48 (2018)
Man in an Orange Shirt (Jun 17)
The Child in Time (Apr 1)

Season 49 (2019)
No New Episodes

Season 50 (2020)
No New Episodes

Season 51 (2021)
Elizabeth Is Missing (Jan 3)

Season 52 (2022)
No New Episodes

References

External links

Masterpiece Contemporary episodes